The sea goldie (Pseudanthias squamipinnis), also known as the orange basslet, lyretail coralfish, onestripe goldie, lyretail anthias, lyretail fairy basslet, orange fairy basslet, orange seaperch, scalefin basslet, scalefin Fairy basslet and scalefin anthias, is a species of marine ray-finned fish, an anthias from the subfamily Anthiinae part of the family Serranidae, the groupers and sea basses. It has a wide Indo-Pacific distribution. It is found in the aquarium trade.

Range
The sea goldie is found in the western Indian Ocean including the Red Sea, and in the Pacific Ocean as far east as Japan and southeast Australia. It is absent from the Persian Gulf and Oman.

Description

This species shows marked sexual dimorphism:
Female: Length up to 7 cm (2.75 in), orange/gold color with violet streak below the eye
Male: Length up to 15 cm (5.9 in), fuchsia color with elongated third ray of the dorsal fin, a red patch on the pectoral fin, and elongated margins of the tail
The midas blenny, Ecsenius midas, goes through a phase of yellow colouration and is a social mimic of the sea goldie.

The sea goldie feeds primarily on zooplankton.  Like other anthias, the sea goldie is a protogynous hermaphrodite; a male retains a harem of five to 10 females, but when the male dies, one of the females will undergo sex reversal and take the place of the missing male. Spawning occurs at sunset, between December and February (in the Red Sea).

Habitat
The fish lives around coral outcrops in clear lagoons, patch reefs, and steep slopes to a depth of 35 m, often found in the company of Chromis dimidiata. They are often found in very large schools above the reef.

Media appearances 
 Pi (Pisces) was a sea goldie in the South Korean-Canadian film The Reef: Shark Bait
 The sea goldie appears in both games of the Endless Ocean franchise.

References

External links
 

sea goldie
Fish of the Red Sea
Fish described in 1885
Taxa named by Wilhelm Peters